Derevnya Uchkhoza selkhoztekhnikuma (Selxoztexnikum uçxozı) is a rural locality (a village) in Kushnarenkovsky Selsoviet, Kushnarenkovsky District, Bashkortostan, Russia. The population was 36 as of 2010. There is 1 street.

Geography 
The village is located 8 km southeast of Kushnarenkovo (the district's administrative centre) by road. Taraberdino is the nearest rural locality.

References 

Rural localities in Kushnarenkovsky District